Filatima adamsi is a moth of the family Gelechiidae. It is found in North America, where it has been recorded from Maine.

The length of the forewings is about 7 mm. The forewings are mainly dark grey brown, with individual scales paler at the base. There is an irregular dark grey-brown mark at three-fifths of the cell, a dark grey-brown blotch at the end of the cell, several dark grey-brown scales along the fold from near the base to three-fourths of the fold, as well as several pale-grey scales on the anterior and posterior margins at four-fifths.

Etymology
The species is named after Mrs. Sally B. Adams, who first collected the species.

References

Moths described in 1997
Filatima